Basharmal Sultani (born January 28, 1985) is an Afghan Olympic athlete, who competed in boxing in the 2004 Summer Olympics in Athens, Greece. He was invited to participate by the International Olympic Committee. He lost his first round bout in the welterweight category to Mohamed Hikal of Egypt on points, 40–12.

See also
Hamid Rahimi
Sport in Afghanistan

References

1985 births
Living people
Welterweight boxers
Afghan male boxers
Boxers at the 2004 Summer Olympics
Olympic boxers of Afghanistan